Monmouth Women's Festival is an annual event in Monmouth, Wales, focusing on issues of interest to women.  It is a not-for-profit cultural festival including workshops, talks and other events, and is organised by a small committee of volunteers.

The 2012 festival, the ninth in the event's history, took place between 2–18 March. Guest speakers included Julia Donaldson, Erin Pizzey and Jennie Bond.

Festival venues, 2012

References

Monmouth, Wales
Festivals in Wales
Women's organisations based in Wales
2004 establishments in Wales
Recurring events established in 2004
Women's events
Annual events in Wales
Women's festivals